The North Central Community College Conference, commonly known as the N4C, is part of the National Junior College Athletic Association (NJCAA). Conference championships are held and individuals can be named to All-Conference and All-Academic teams.

The founding members of 1970 were the College of Du Page, Illinois Valley Community College, Joliet Junior College, Morton College, Rock Valley College, and Thornton Community College.

Member schools

Current members

Full
The NCCCC (or N4C) currently has five full members, all are public schools:

Notes

Associate

Former members
The NCCCC (or N4C) had two former full members, both were public schools:

Full

Notes

Associate
The NCCCC (or N4C) had one associate member, which was also a public school:

Notes

Sports

Men's
Baseball
Basketball
Soccer

Women's
Basketball
Soccer
Softball
Volleyball

See also
National Junior College Athletic Association (NJCAA)
Illinois Skyway Conference, also in Region 4
Arrowhead Conference, also in Region 4

References

External links
Official website
NJCAA website
JUCO championships
NJCAA Region 4 website

NJCAA conferences
College sports in Illinois
College sports in Wisconsin